Daltaí na Gaeilge (meaning "Students of Irish"; DnaG) is an organization that operates Irish language immersion programs in the American states of New York, New Jersey and Pennsylvania.  It also serves as a resource for Irish language students from across the English-speaking world to connect with qualified instructors.

History
The organization was founded by Ethel Brogan, a native of Armagh, Northern Ireland who learned Irish by spending one month each summer in the Gaeltacht.  She emigrated to New York City in 1946 and eventually moved to upstate New York.

In the United States, Brogan began teaching Irish classes for the benefit of interested neighbors.  In 1981, she arranged the first "Gaeltacht Weekend" in New York for students to improve their Irish language skills through total immersion.

That initial immersion weekend led to the foundation of Daltaí na Gaeilge, a non-profit organization registered in the state of New Jersey.  Today, in addition to offering Irish language classes in the NY-NJ-PA tri-state area, Daltaí na Gaeilge operates a website that provides discussion boards, online language lessons and many other resources for students and teachers of the Irish language.

External links
Daltaí na Gaeilge

Irish culture
Irish language organisations
Non-profit organizations based in the United States
Language immersion